Estola obscurella is a species of beetle in the family Cerambycidae. It was described by Monné and Giesbert in 1992. It is known from Brazil.

References

Estola
Beetles described in 1992